Dorotheus Magdalenus "Dorus" Nijland (26 February 1880 – 13 December 1968) was a Dutch track and road racing cyclist. Nijland was a sprinter. He was an amateur cyclist and later Nijland became a professional cyclist (1913–1915) and continued cycling as a master. His total career was between 1905 and 1935. He won over a hundred prizes, and competed at the 1908 Summer Olympics.

Career
Nijland competed mainly on the defunct track "Zeeburgerbaan" in Amsterdam. He finished eleven times 2nd at the Dutch National Track Championships. In the early years of his career his finished behind Jan Tulleken from Haarlem. After Tulleken became a professional cyclist, he finished second behind Bosch van Drakestein. As second places became kind of an obsession during his career, he got the nickname “pechkampioen” (translated: bad luck champion). He competed at the 1907 Grand Prix in Antwerp, an international race in Belgium. He reached the finals, but finished second behind Belgian cyclist Van Moll. Nijland was invited for the Grand Prix of Brussels; again he finished second. It was approved by the Dutch national cycling union that Nijlamd and Jan Tulleken competed at the 1907 UCI Track Cycling World Championships in Paris. In the amateur sprint event he finished at the bottom of the ranking. He competed in six events at the 1908 Summer Olympics in London. In the team pursuit event, after having a bye in the heats. In the semi-final they started too fast and Nijland fell and so they finished fourth. At the 1910 UCI Track Cycling World Championships he would have won his heat of Frenchman Paul Texier (who won the bronze medal), but the officials named Texier as the winner. Around 1910, he won on the tandem with partner Ko Brunt many competitions in Europe.

After his career he stayed active in the cycling sport. On his 75th birthday in 1955, he was honored with an article about his career in De Volkskrant.

See also
 List of Dutch Olympic cyclists

References

External links
 

1880 births
1968 deaths
Dutch male cyclists
Olympic cyclists of the Netherlands
Cyclists at the 1908 Summer Olympics
Cyclists from Amsterdam
Dutch track cyclists
Dutch cyclists at the UCI Track Cycling World Championships